Three was a post-hardcore band signed to Dischord Records.

Originally composed of Ian Mackaye and Jeff Nelson along with Geoff Turner and Steve Niles of the band Gray Matter, Mackaye left the band quickly and was replaced by Mark Haggerty, also from Gray Matter. They formed in summer 1986 and broke up in the winter of 1987–88, a year before their album was released.

Their sole album, Dark Days Coming was released in 1989 (after the band broke up), and remastered in 2010.

Discography
Dark Days Coming (1989), Dischord

Compilation appearances
 20 Years of Dischord (2002) - "Domino Days"

References

American post-hardcore musical groups
Dischord Records artists